Isocoma menziesii is a species of flowering plant in the family Asteraceae, known by the common name Menzies' goldenbush.

It is native to California, Baja California, and Baja California Sur, where it grows in coastal and inland habitat such as chaparral, particularly in sandy soils.

Description
The erect branching stems may be hairless to woolly, are generally glandular, and vary in color from gray-green to reddish brown.

The abundant inflorescences are clusters of thick flower heads. Each head is a capsule with layers of thick, pointed, greenish phyllaries. The head is filled with large, protruding, cylindrical yellow disc florets with long stigmas.

Varieties
 Isocoma menziesii var. decumbens (Greene) G.L.Nesom - far northern Baja California, San Diego County, Channel Islands
Isocoma menziesii var. diabolica G. L. Nesom - Santa Clara + San Benito Counties
 Isocoma menziesii var. menziesii - Baja California, Baja California Sur, San Diego County, Orange County, western Riverside County, Channel Islands
 Isocoma menziesii var. sedoides (Greene) G.L.Nesom - from Orange to San Luis Obispo Counties including Channel Islands
 Isocoma menziesii var. tridentata (Greene) G.L.Nesom - southern Baja California including Isla Cedros, northern Baja California Sur
 Isocoma menziesii var. vernonioides (Nutt.) G.L.Nesom - from Monterey County to northern Baja California

References

External links

Jepson Manual Treatment of Isocoma menziesii
Isocoma menziesii — Calphotos Photos gallery, University of California

menzies
Flora of California
Flora of Baja California
Flora of Baja California Sur
Natural history of the California chaparral and woodlands
Natural history of the Channel Islands of California
Natural history of the Peninsular Ranges
Natural history of the Santa Monica Mountains
Natural history of the Transverse Ranges
Plants described in 1839
Flora without expected TNC conservation status